The men's 4x100 metres relay event at the 1986 World Junior Championships in Athletics was held in Athens, Greece, at Olympic Stadium on 19 and 20 July.

Medalists

Results

Final
20 July

Heats
19 July

Heat 1

Heat 2

Heat 3

Participation
According to an unofficial count, 93 athletes from 23 countries participated in the event.

References

4 x 100 metres relay
Relays at the World Athletics U20 Championships